Bell House, also known as the summer home of Alexander Graham Bell, is a historic home located at Colonial Beach, Westmoreland County, Virginia. It is a -story, five-bay Stick Style frame dwelling originally built between 1883 and 1885 for Helen and Colonel J.O.P Burnside.  It features a wraparound porch with turned posts and sawn brackets and a central projecting tower with a pyramidal roof and balcony overhang.  Also on the property are a contributing privy and garage (c. 1930).  Alexander Graham Bell inherited the property in 1907 from his father Alexander Melville Bell, who acquired it in 1886, and held it continuously until 1918.

It was listed on the National Register of Historic Places in 1987.

References

Houses in Westmoreland County, Virginia
Houses on the National Register of Historic Places in Virginia
Queen Anne architecture in Virginia
Alexander Graham Bell
Houses completed in 1885
National Register of Historic Places in Westmoreland County, Virginia
Stick-Eastlake architecture in the United States
History of Virginia